KONI (104.7 FM) is a radio station licensed to serve Lanai City, Hawaii.  The station is owned by Hochman Hawaii Publishing, Inc.  It airs an Oldies music format.

The station was assigned the KONI call letters by the Federal Communications Commission on May 31, 1991.

References

External links
KONI official website

ONI
Oldies radio stations in the United States
1991 establishments in Hawaii